Stephen ("Steve") Muchoki (born 23 December 1956) is a retired light flyweight boxer from Kenya, who had an excellent career (197 wins, three losses) as an amateur. He won the silver medal at the inaugural 1974 World Amateur Boxing Championships in Havana, Cuba. The same year he captured the title at the 1974 Commonwealth Games in Christchurch, New Zealand.

Muchoki was to represent Kenya at the 1976 Summer Olympics in Montreal, Quebec, Canada, but Kenya choose to boycott. Two years later he won the world title at the 1978 World Amateur Boxing Championships in Belgrade, Yugoslavia, and the gold medal at the 1978 Commonwealth Games once again.

References
 
 Boxing-Records

1956 births
Living people
Light-flyweight boxers
Boxers at the 1974 British Commonwealth Games
Boxers at the 1978 Commonwealth Games
Commonwealth Games gold medallists for Kenya
Kenyan male boxers
AIBA World Boxing Championships medalists
Commonwealth Games medallists in boxing
African Games silver medalists for Kenya
African Games medalists in boxing
Competitors at the 1978 All-Africa Games
African Boxing Union champions
Medallists at the 1974 British Commonwealth Games
Medallists at the 1978 Commonwealth Games